Ralph Hopiavuori (born July 15, 1951) is a Canadian former professional ice hockey player who played in the World Hockey Association (WHA). Hopiavuori played parts of three WHA seasons with the Cleveland Crusaders and Indianapolis Racers. He was drafted in the third round of the 1971 NHL Amateur Draft by the Toronto Maple Leafs. Hopiavuori was born in Kirkland Lake, Ontario.

Career statistics

References

External links

1951 births
Canadian ice hockey defencemen
Cleveland Crusaders players
Ice hockey people from Ontario
Indianapolis Racers players
Jacksonville Barons players
Kitchener Rangers players
Living people
Mohawk Valley Comets (NAHL) players
Port Huron Wings players
Roanoke Valley Rebels (SHL) players
Sportspeople from Kirkland Lake
Toronto Maple Leafs draft picks
Toronto Marlboros players